The United States Virgin Islands is an unincorporated territory of the United States that comprises a group of islands in the Caribbean. In addition to the main residential islands of Saint Thomas, Saint Croix, Saint John, and Water Island, there are roughly 50 other islands and cays.  These include:

Saint Croix
Buck Island (National Park)
Green Cay National Wildlife Refuge
Protestant Cay
Ruth Island

East End, Saint Thomas
Cas Cay
Dog Island
Great Saint James
Little Saint James
Shark Island
Thatch Cay

West End, Saint Thomas
Kalkun Cay
Savana Island

Northside, Saint Thomas
Hans Lollik Islands
Inner Brass
Outer Brass

Southside, Saint Thomas
Buck Island
Capella Island
Hassel Island (National Park)
Saba Island
Turtledove Cay

Central, Saint John
Carvel Rock
Congo Cay
Grass Cay
Lovango Cay
Mingo Cay
Steven Cay

Northside, Saint John
Cinnamon Cay
Henley Cay
Ramgoat Cay
Trunk Cay
Waterlemon Cay
Whistling Cay

East End, Saint John
Flanagan Island
Leduck Island

See also
Islands of the United States Virgin Islands
Danish West Indies
Danish colonization of the Americas

References

Islands